Samuel Burrage Reed was an American architect of Corona, New York, and Woodcliff Lake, New Jersey. He was active in mid-to-late nineteenth-century and early twentieth-century America, particularly in New York State, New York City, and Connecticut.

Born in Meriden, Connecticut, he was first trained as a carpenter before becoming an architect. He is notable for designing several mansions, as well as public and ecclesiastical buildings. Reed was a member of the American Institute of Architects (AIA).

Works
1903 – Passaic County Court House, Paterson, New Jersey. 
1891 – New Middle Collegiate Church, Second Avenue, New York City.
1890 – Chester Wickwire House, Cortland, New York (now the 1890 House Museum).
1889 - First Presbyterian Church Complex (Cortland, New York)
1888 – James Bailey House, Manhattan, New York City (of Barnum & Bailey Circus fame).
1883 – John C. Reichert House, Tipton, Iowa.
Pinard Cottages, Newport, Rhode Island.

References
Notes

External links

1834 births
People from Meriden, Connecticut
American ecclesiastical architects
Gothic Revival architects
Architects from New York City
Year of death missing
People from Corona, Queens
People from Woodcliff Lake, New Jersey
Architects from Connecticut
Architects from New Jersey
19th-century American architects
20th-century American architects